María Lucía Fernández (born October 14, 1968 in Bogotá) is a Colombian journalist and news presenter. 
She worked as a model in her teens to afford her studies in Social Communication at the Pontificia Universidad Javeriana. As news presenter, she worked in TV shows like Panorama, QAP Noticias and 7:30 Caracol. Since 1998, she's one of the main newsreaders at Caracol Noticias. She also worked at Caracol Radio until 2004.

Fernández, also known as Malú, likes to write and read in her free time.

External links
  En Colombia
  Revista Diners
  INTE Awards 2004 - Profile and QuickTime reel

Colombian television journalists
Colombian women television journalists
Colombian television presenters
Colombian women television presenters
1968 births
Living people